Aegle (minor planet designation: 96 Aegle) is a carbonaceous asteroid and the namesake of the Aegle family located in the outer regions of the asteroid belt, approximately  in diameter. It was discovered on 17 February 1868, by French astronomer Jérôme Coggia at the Marseille Observatory in southeastern France. The rare T-type asteroid has a rotation period of 13.8 hours and has been observed several times during occultation events. It was named after Aegle, one of the Hesperides (nymphs of the evening) from Greek mythology.

Orbit and classification 

Aegle is the parent body of the Aegle family, a very small asteroid family of less than a hundred known members. It orbits the Sun in the outer asteroid belt at a distance of 2.6–3.5 AU once every 5 years and 4 months (1,948 days; semi-major axis of 3.05 AU). Its orbit has an eccentricity of 0.14 and an inclination of 16° with respect to the ecliptic. The body's observation arc begins at Litchfield Observatory  in August 1870, two and a half years after its official discovery observation at Marseille.

Physical characteristics 

In both the Tholen and SMASS classification as well as in the Bus–DeMeo taxonomy, Aegle is a rare, anhydrous T-type asteroid, while the overall spectral type for the Aegle family is typically that of a C- and X-type.

Rotation period 

Photometric observations of the asteroid by American photometrist Frederick Pilcher from his Organ Mesa Observatory  in New Mexico during 2016−17 showed an irregular lightcurve with a synodic rotation period of 13.868 hours and an amplitude of 0.11 in magnitude.

This result is in good agreement with two previous observations by Robert Stephens, and by Cyril Cavadore and Pierre Antonini who measured a period of 13.82 hours and a brightness variation of 0.12 and 0.05, respectively. Other rotational lightcurves obtained by Alan Harris (10 h; 1980), by Italian (10.47 h; 2000), and Swiss/French astronomers (13.82 h; 2005), and at the Colgate University (26.53 h; 2001), are of poor quality.

Diameter and albedo 

According to the surveys carried out by the Infrared Astronomical Satellite IRAS, the Japanese Akari satellite and the NEOWISE mission of NASA's Wide-field Infrared Survey Explorer, Aegle measures between 156 and 178 kilometers in diameter and its surface has a low albedo between 0.048 and 0.056. The Collaborative Asteroid Lightcurve Link assumes an albedo of 0.058 and calculates a diameter of 162.85 kilometers based on an absolute magnitude of 7.65.

Occultations 

Aegle has been observed occulting stars several times. On 5 January 2010, it occulted the star  as seen from Ibaraki, Japan, and allowed to determine a cross-section of  kilometers. In New Zealand, on 18 February 2002, it occulted the star  in the constellation of Centaurus for approximately 12.7 seconds during which a drop of 2.1 in magnitude was to be expected.

Naming 

This minor planet was named after Aegle) one of the Hesperides in Greek mythology. The official naming citation was mentioned in The Names of the Minor Planets by Paul Herget in 1955.

Notes

References

External links 

 Asteroid Lightcurve Database (LCDB), query form (info )
 Dictionary of Minor Planet Names, Google books
 Asteroids and comets rotation curves, CdR – Observatoire de Genève, Raoul Behrend
 Discovery Circumstances: Numbered Minor Planets (1)-(5000) – Minor Planet Center
 
 

Aegle asteroids
Discoveries by Jérôme Coggia
Aegle
Objects observed by stellar occultation
T-type asteroids (Tholen)
T-type asteroids (SMASS)
18680217